Miomantis fallax is a species of praying mantis in the family Miomantidae.

See also
List of mantis genera and species

References

F